The 2013 season was the 132nd year in the history of Warwickshire County Cricket Club and their 119th as a first-class county. In 2013, Warwickshire competed in the first division of the County Championship, Group B of the Yorkshire Bank 40 and the Midland/Wales/West Division of the Friends Life t20.

Squad
The age given is for the start of Warwickshire's first match of the season, on 13 April 2013.

County Championship

Division One Table

Results

Yorkshire Bank 40

Group A Table

Results

Friends Life t20

Midlands/Wales/West Table

Results

References

2013 in English cricket
2013